= Radiofax (radio station) =

Irish shortwave radio station

Radiofax was an independent shortwave radio station that broadcast from Ireland between 1988 and 1992. It carried talk programmes on science, technology and media news, as well as contemporary popular music. "Britain's Number Two Shortwave Station," (the BBC World Service being number one) was forced to broadcast from various locations in Ireland because all of their requests for a licence from the British government had been refused. Founder and sponsor Trevor Brook subsequently took the licence battle to the High Court in London and the European Court of Human Rights in Strasbourg.

The station operated on various mediumwave and shortwave frequencies including 1611, 3910, 6205, 6225 and 12255 kHz.
